The 2009 LPGA Tour was a series of weekly golf tournaments for elite female golfers from around the world that took place from February through November 2009. The tournaments were sanctioned by the United States-based Ladies Professional Golf Association (LPGA).

2009 saw a reduction in both the number of tournaments and the total prize money on the Tour. Official prize money was $47.6 million, the lowest total in since 2005. There were 28 official tournaments, the lowest number since at least 2004.

Rookie Jiyai Shin topped the money list, earning $1,807,334. In addition Shin took Rookie of the Year honors. Shin and Lorena Ochoa each won three tournaments during the season.  Ochoa also won the Player of the Year trophy for the fourth consecutive year and the Vare Trophy for the lowest scoring average, also for the fourth consecutive year.

Anna Nordqvist was runner-up in the Rookie of the Year race, topping off a season that began with her having only conditional status on the LPGA Tour. She won the fifth tournament in which she played in 2009, the McDonald's LPGA Championship, a major, and also won the season-ending LPGA Tour Championship, ending the season 15th on the official money list.

The four major championships were won by: Brittany Lincicome (Kraft Nabisco Championship), Anna Nordqvist (LPGA Championship), Eun-Hee Ji (U.S. Women's Open), and Catriona Matthew (Women's British Open).  All major winners were first-time major winners. Matthew won her the British Open 10 weeks after giving birth to her second child.

The LPGA experienced a turn-over in leadership in 2009, when commissioner Carolyn Bivens resigned under pressure from players in July. At the time of Bivens' resignation, the tour had only 14 events committed for the 2010 schedule, having failed to sign key long-term tournaments, notably the LPGA Corning Classic.  On October 28, the LPGA board of directors announced that marketing executive Michael Whan had been hired as the permanent replacement for Bivens and would assume his duties in January 2010.

Tournament schedule and results
The number in parentheses after winners' names show the player's total number wins in official money individual events on the LPGA Tour, including that event.

An asterisk next to a tournament name means that the event is unofficial.
Tournaments in bold are majors.

Leaders
Money List leaders

Full 2009 Official Money List - navigate to "2009"

Scoring Average leaders

Full 2009 Scoring Average List - navigate to "2009", then "Scoring Average"

Award winners
The three competitive awards given out by the LPGA each year are:
The Rolex Player of the Year is awarded based on a formula in which points are awarded for top-10 finishes and are doubled at the LPGA's four major championships. The points system is: 30 points for first; 12 points for second; nine points for third; seven points for fourth; six points for fifth; five points for sixth; four points for seventh; three points for eighth; two points for ninth and one point for 10th.
2009 Winner:  Lorena Ochoa. Runner-up: Jiyai Shin
The Vare Trophy, named for Glenna Collett-Vare, is given to the player with the lowest scoring average for the season.
2009 Winner:  Lorena Ochoa. Runner-up: Jiyai Shin
The Louis Suggs Rolex Rooke of the Year Award is awarded to the first-year player on the LPGA Tour who scores the highest in a points competition in which points are awarded at all full-field domestic events and doubled at the LPGA's four major championships. The points system is: 150 points for first; 80 points for second; 75 points for third; 70 points for fourth; and 65 points for fifth. After fifth place, points are awarded in increments of three, beginning at sixth place with 62 points. Rookies who make the cut in an event and finish below 41st each receive five points.  The award is named after Louise Suggs, one of the founders of the LPGA.
2009 Winner:  Jiyai Shin. Runner-up:  Anna Nordqvist

See also
2009 in golf
2009 Duramed Futures Tour
2009 Ladies European Tour

References 

LPGA Tour seasons
LPGA Tour